is a Japanese music variety show that airs on NHK BS Premium. The show premiered on NHK BS 2 on April 9, 2000 and continues to this day. Worldwide, it airs on NHK World Premium and TV Japan (US) as Pop Music Club

It features the juniors of Johnny & Associates. In addition to singing songs and participating in discussions, there is a segment that brings out the personality of the performers, such as quizzes.

Cast
Keiichiro Koyama (NEWS) (April 9, 2006 – March 24, 2011)
Yuichi Nakamaru (KAT-TUN) (April 9, 2006 – March 24, 2011)
Hey! Say! JUMP (April 8, 2011 – March 26, 2014)
Fumito Kawai (A.B.C-Z) (April 2, 2014 – March 30, 2018)
Akito Kiriyama (Johnny's WEST) (April 2, 2014 – March 30, 2018)

Regular appearance
A.B.C-Z
Sexy Zone
Johnny's WEST
King & Prince
Johnny's Jr.
Kansai Johnny's Jr.

Shounen Club Premium

 is a Japanese music variety show hosted by NEWS and broadcast on NHK BS Premium. The hour-long show premiered on April 23, 2006.

MC
Taichi Kokubun (April 2006 – March 2014) 
KAT-TUN (April 2014 – March 2016)
NEWS (April 2016 – March 2019)
Kis-My-Ft2 (April 2019 – present)

References

External links
Official Website

Johnny & Associates
NHK original programming